Kaimhill is a district in Aberdeen, Scotland. 

Its post code is AB10. Children attend Kaimhill Primary School and Harlaw Academy.

References

Areas of Aberdeen